Lumberto Ignacio Campbell (born February 3, 1949) is a Nicaraguan Sandinista politician. Campbell was born in Bluefields, Nicaragua and was the only Creole guerilla commander in the Sandinista National Liberation Front (FSLN), known by the nom de guerre "El Negro". In the 1980s he served as Vice-Minister for the Atlantic Coast. In 2014, the National Assembly named him to the Supreme Electoral Council, where he replaced Emmett Lang as vice-president.

In November 2019, following widespread protests and ensuing suppression by the FSLN government, Campbell was sanctioned by the United States government for alleged human rights abuses, election fraud and corruption. This froze his US assets and prohibited US citizens from doing business with him.

Campbell's brother, Francisco Campbell, is Nicaragua's Ambassador to the United States.

References

Living people
Sandinista National Liberation Front politicians
1949 births